This is a list of electoral results for the Electoral district of Rodney in Victorian state elections.

Members for Rodney

Election results

Elections in the 2010s

Elections in the 2000s

Elections in the 1990s

Elections in the 1980s

Elections in the 1970s

Elections in the 1960s

 The two candidate preferred vote was not counted between the Country and Liberal candidates for Rodney.

Elections in the 1950s

Elections in the 1940s

 Richard Brose joined the Country Party after being elected to parliament.

Elections in the 1930s

 Preferences were not fully distributed.

Elections in the 1920s

 Preferences were not distributed.

Elections in the 1910s

 Two party preferred vote was estimated.

References

 

Victoria (Australia) state electoral results by district